The Averting Loss of Life and Injury by Expediting SIVs Act (ALLIES) Act is a bipartisan piece of legislation would remove or revise some statutory requirements in the Special Immigrant Visa (SIV) process and designed to expedite the SIV process and increase the total number of visas available by several thousand.

Provisions 
In a press release, sponsor Jason Crow (D-CO) listed aims of the Act:

 Increase the SIV allotment by an additional 8,000 visas to cover all potentially eligible applicants and their families currently in the pipeline;
 Amend the credible threat requirement, removing the necessity for applicants to provide additional paperwork to establish a credible threat we know exists for applicants with verified U.S. government ties; 
 Strengthen protections for surviving spouses and children, allowing them to retain eligibility if the primary SIV applicant dies before visa approval;
 Clarify eligibility for certain Afghans who worked for Non-Government Organizations (NGOs) under cooperative agreements and grants with the U.S. government, including those performing critical democracy, human rights, and governance work; 
 Remove the requirement for International Security Assistance Force or Resolute Support Mission employment to be “sensitive and trusted”, expanding the field of qualified applicants; and 
 Eliminate paperwork by giving the Department of Homeland Security the flexibility not to require a I-360 petition in cases where the State Department has already determined an applicant's eligibility through the Chief of Mission process.

Legislative History

Reactions 
The Biden Administration issued a Statement of Administration Policy on the ALLIES Act, stating, “This legislation supports the President’s goal of ensuring the United States meets our commitments to those who served with us in Afghanistan… H.R. 3985 will assist in our efforts to streamline the application process by removing or revising some statutory requirements the Administration has found to be unnecessary and burdensome, while maintaining appropriate security vetting, and by increasing the total number of visas available to help meet the demand. These changes...are critical to expediting the application process and helping us get more Afghan partners through the process and into safety.”

The ALLIES Act has the support of high ranking national security, defense, and foreign policy individuals, including former Secretary of State Madeleine Albright, former Secretaries of Defense Robert Gates and Chuck Hagel, former Chairman of the Joint Chiefs of Staff retired Admiral Michael Mullen, former National Security Advisors Stephen J. Hadley and retired Lt. General H. R. McMaster.

The ALLIES Act has also been endorsed by The American Legion, No One Left Behind, The National Immigration Forum, Union Veterans Council, VoteVets, Human Rights First, Vets for American Ideals, Enlisted Association of the National Guard of the United States (EANGUS), Military Chaplains Association of the United States of America (MCA), Military Order of the Purple Heart (MOPH), Reserve Officers of America (ROA), Korean War Veterans Association, American Ex-Prisoners of War, Association of Wartime Allies, Lutheran Immigration and Refugee Service (LIRS), and Association of the U.S. Army (AUSA).

See also
 Operation Allies Refuge
 2021 evacuation from Afghanistan
 Withdrawal of United States troops from Afghanistan (2020–2021)

References

Proposed legislation of the 117th United States Congress
War in Afghanistan (2001–2021)
Visa policy of the United States
Afghanistan–United States relations